Hyles malgassica is a moth of the  family Sphingidae. It is known from Madagascar.

References

Hyles (moth)
Moths described in 1944